Gabriella Sundar Singh is a Canadian actress best known for her role as Chelsea Chettiar on the Canadian comedy show Kim's Convenience.

Early life 
Singh was born and raised in Toronto, Ontario. In addition to her acting career, she is also a trained Bharathanatyam dancer.

Education 
She attended the University of Guelph, and graduated from the School of English and Theatre Studies in 2011, majoring in Theatre Studies with an Honours degree. She then pursued post-graduate studies in Children's Entertainment at Centennial College. Later, she attended the National Theatre School of Canada from 2014 to 2017.

Career

Television 
She appears in episodes of Kim's Convenience, Taken, Frankie Drake Mysteries, Brothers in the Kitchen, and Designated Survivor.

Stage 
She has performed in the Shaw Festival, in Prince Caspian, The Playboy of the Western World, The Russian Play, Brigadoon, and O’Flaherty V.C. She was also the director for Sisterhood (Secret Theatre, 2018).

References 

21st-century Canadian actresses
Canadian actresses of Indian descent
Actresses from Toronto
Canadian stage actresses
Canadian television actresses
University of Guelph alumni
Centennial College alumni
National Theatre School of Canada alumni
Canadian people of Sri Lankan descent
Living people
Year of birth missing (living people)